Eastland Mall may refer to:

 Eastland Mall (Bloomington, Illinois)
 Eastland Mall (Evansville, Indiana)
 Eastland Mall (Charlotte, North Carolina)
 Eastland Mall (Columbus, Ohio)
 Eastland Mall (North Versailles, Pennsylvania)

Formerly known as Eastland Mall
 Eastgate Metroplex, Tulsa, Oklahoma
 Courtland Center, Burton, Michigan